The Jacques Peaks are a set of peaks rising to  at the northwest end of Reclus Peninsula on the west coast of Graham Land, Antarctica. They were shown on an Argentine government chart of 1954, and named by the UK Antarctic Place-Names Committee in 1960 for Greville L. Jacques, a senior helicopter pilot with the Falkland Islands and Dependencies Aerial Survey Expedition, 1955–57, who made a landing on one of these peaks to establish a survey station. The peaks are the most conspicuous feature on Reclus Peninsula.

References

Mountains of Graham Land
Danco Coast